Bray Emmets Gaelic Athletic Association is a hurling, camogie, Gaelic football and ladies' Gaelic football club in Bray, County Wicklow, Ireland.

History
The first club AGM took place on 11 December 1886. The first recorded Bray Emmets team played Dalkey in a field at the Vevay in 1885. The club took its name from Robert Emmet (1778–1803), an Irish rebel leader.

The club host the annual All-Ireland Kick Fada Championship, first held in 2000.

Honours

Hurling
 Leinster Intermediate Club Hurling Championship (1) 2022
 Wicklow Senior Hurling Championship (8) 1952, 2014, 2015, 2016, 2019, 2020, 2021, 2022
 Wicklow Intermediate Hurling Championship (3) 2006, 2015, 2022
 Wicklow Junior Hurling Championship (3) 2004, 2014, 2020 (Played 11/06/2021 due to covid restrictions)

Football
 Wicklow Senior Football Championship (3) 1934, 1935
 Dublin Senior Football Championship (1) 1901
 Wicklow Intermediate Football Championship (2) 1973, 1997
 Wicklow Junior B Football Championship (1) 2022

Camogie
 Wicklow Intermediate Camogie Championship (2) 2017, 2019
 Wicklow Junior Camogie Championship (1) 2016

Ladies Football
 Wicklow Ladies Football Senior B Championship (1) 2017

Notable players
 John Henderson
 Finn Bálor
 Dara Ó Briain
 Christy Moorehouse

References

External links
Official site

Sport in Bray, County Wicklow
Gaelic games clubs in County Wicklow
Gaelic football clubs in County Wicklow
1885 establishments in Ireland